Fraggle Rock is a children's television series created by Jim Henson. Episode descriptions are listed below for the original English-language North American version of the program broadcast by CBC and HBO. Consequently, the other versions made for FR3 in France, ITV in the UK and ZDF in Germany may not correlate with the details listed below.

Series overview

Episodes

Season 1 (1983)

Season 2 (1984)

Season 3 (1984-85)

Season 4 (1986)

Season 5 (1987)

References

External links
 

Episodes
Lists of American children's television series episodes
Lists of British children's television series episodes
Lists of Canadian children's television series episodes